Maurice Thiriet (2 May 1906 – 28 September 1972) was a French composer of classical and film music.

Biography

Born in Meulan, Yvelines, Maurice Thiriet attended the Paris Conservatory from 1925 to 1931, studying counterpoint and fugue with Charles Koechlin, and orchestration and arrangement under Alexis Roland-Manuel. Thiriet's career revolved mainly around film music, completing around seventy scores from 1942 to 1960. A fellow composer Maurice Jaubert, whose life was cut short during World War II, is often cited as a major influence on Thiriet's outlook. 

Besides his cinematic output, Thiriet also composed several concert works, including a concerto for the flute, twelve ballets, and three operas. His compositional style, which Jaubert and Roland-Manuel influenced, is characterized by taught construction and modest, nearly impressionistic harmonization, often bearing a neo-classical grace similar to that of the music of Francis Poulenc and Jean Françaix. Thiriet's work was also presented in the art competition during the 1948 Summer Olympics.
Thiriet also wrote La Nigérienne, the national anthem of Niger, in 1961.

List of works

Stage and dramatic
La Bourgois de Falaise – opera (1937)
Psyché – ballet (1950)
Herakles – ballet (1953)
Œdipe-roi – sur le texte de Jean Cocteau for speaker and orchestra (1940–41) and on stage (1963)
La véridique histoire du docteur – opéra comique (1937)
La Locandiera – opéra-bouffe (1960)
L'œuf à la coque – ballet (1949)
Deuil en 24 heures – ballet (1953)
La nuit vénitienne – ballet (1939)
La chaloupée – ballet (1960)
La chambre noire – ballet-bouffe (1955)
La précaution inutile (sur des thèmes de Rossini) – ballet (1946)
La reine des iles – ballet (1955)
Le maure de Venise – ballet (1958)
Les amants de Mayerling – ballet (1960)
Les jeux de l'amour et du placard – ballet-opérette (1953)
Messaline – théatre (1947)
Vogue la galère – théatre (1952)

Orchestra
Le Livre pour Jean (1929)
Rhapsody on Inca Themes (1935)
Poem, for strings (1936)
La Nuit Fantasque (1941)
Les visiteurs du soir (1947)

Concertante
Introduction, Chanson et Ronde, harp and orchestra (1936)
Flute Concerto, flute and string orchestra (1959)

Selected filmography
 Once Upon a Time (1933)
 Southern Mail (1937)
 Adrienne Lecouvreur (1938)
 The Wolf of the Malveneurs (1943)
 Pamela (1945)
 Not So Stupid (1946)
 Le Bataillon du ciel (1947)
 Eternal Conflict (1948)
 Three Boys, One Girl  (1948)
 Mystery in Shanghai (1950)
 Passion (1951)
 The House on the Dune (1952)
 The Air of Paris (1954)
 La Tour, prends garde ! (1958)
 Eyes of Love (1959)

References

Sources
^ Mark Brill "Maurice Thiriet" in The Grove Dictionary of Music and Musicians

External links
 

1906 births
1972 deaths
Conservatoire de Paris alumni
French classical composers
French male classical composers
French opera composers
Male opera composers
People from Meulan-en-Yvelines
20th-century classical composers
20th-century French composers
20th-century French male musicians
Olympic competitors in art competitions